Stranglehold is a 1963 British drama film directed by Lawrence Huntington and starring Macdonald Carey, Barbara Shelley and Philip Friend.

Production
The film was made as a second feature for distribution by the Rank Organisation. It was shot at Pinewood Studios. The film's sets were designed by the art director Duncan Sutherland.

Synopsis
An American actor known for his gangster roles is in London to shoot a new film, but begins to fear that he had murdered his wife in a fit of rage.

Cast
 Macdonald Carey as Bill Morrison
 Barbara Shelley as Chris Morrison
 Philip Friend as Steffan
 Nadja Regin as Lilli
 Leonard Sachs as The Dutchman
 Mark Loerering as Jimmy Morrison
 Susan Shaw as Actress
 Josephine Brown as Grace

References

Bibliography
 Chibnall, Steve & McFarlane, Brian. The British 'B' Film. Palgrave MacMillan, 2009.

External links

1963 films
British drama films
1963 drama films
Films directed by Lawrence Huntington
Films shot at Pinewood Studios
Films about filmmaking
Films set in London
Films scored by Eric Spear
1960s English-language films
1960s British films